Temple Square is a  complex, owned by the Church of Jesus Christ of Latter-day Saints (LDS Church), in the center of Salt Lake City, Utah. The usage of the name has gradually changed to include several other church facilities that are immediately adjacent to Temple Square. Contained within Temple Square are the Salt Lake Temple, Salt Lake Tabernacle, Salt Lake Assembly Hall, the Seagull Monument, and two visitors' centers. The square was designated a National Historic Landmark District in 1964, recognizing the Mormon achievement in the settlement of Utah.

History

In 1847, when Mormon pioneers arrived in the Salt Lake Valley, president Brigham Young selected a plot of the desert ground, initially referred to as Temple Block, and proclaimed, "Here we will build a temple to our God." When the city was surveyed, the block enclosing that location was designated for the temple, and became known as Temple Square. Temple Square is surrounded by a 15-foot wall that was built shortly after the block was so designated.

The square also became the headquarters of the Church of Jesus Christ of Latter-day Saints. Other buildings were built on the plot, including a tabernacle (prior to the one occupying Temple Square today) and Endowment House, both of which were later torn down. The Salt Lake Tabernacle, home of The Tabernacle Choir at Temple Square, was built in 1867 to accommodate the church's general conferences, with a seating capacity of 8,000. Another church building, the Salt Lake Assembly Hall, was later built with a seating capacity of 2,000.

As the church has grown, its headquarters have expanded into the surrounding area. In 1917, an administration building was built on the block east of the temple and in 1972, the twenty-eight story LDS Church Office Building, which was, for many years, the tallest building in the state of Utah. The Hotel Utah, another building on this block, was remodeled in 1995 as additional office space and a large film theater and renamed the Joseph Smith Memorial Building. In 2000, the church purchased the section of Main Street between this block and Temple Square and connected the two blocks with a plaza called the Main Street Plaza. In 2000, the church completed a new, 21,000 seat Conference Center on the block north of Temple Square.

In 2020, many of the buildings on and around Temple Square were closed due to the COVID-19 pandemic, and the 4-year renovation project.

Modern usage

Tourism
Attracting 3 million to 5 million visitors a year, Temple Square is the most popular tourist attraction in Utah, bringing in more visitors than the Grand Canyon or Yellowstone National Park. By comparison, Utah's five National Parks—Zion, Bryce Canyon, Capitol Reef, Canyonlands, and Arches—had a combined total of 5.3 million visitors in 2005.

Tourism on Temple Square is different than tourism at other religious sites like Mission San Juan Capistrano because of its focus on religiosity rather than education or fundraising.

General Conference

Lighting
The grounds, as well as the Gardens at Temple Square, often host concerts and other events. During the Christmas holiday season, approximately 100,000 Christmas lights sparkle from trees and shrubs around Temple Square each evening until 10 pm. The lighting of Temple Square is a popular event, usually attended by more than 10,000 people.

Other uses
The multiple gates to Temple Square are popular places for critics of the Church of Jesus Christ of Latter-day Saints—mainly former members and activist evangelical ministers—to picket and hand out tracts and literature critical of the church. They are also well-known locations for street musicians to perform, especially during the holiday season.

Street directions
Temple Square serves as the center point for all street addresses in Salt Lake City. The streets in Salt Lake follow a grid pattern which deviate out from the southeast corner of Temple Square.

Sites

Salt Lake Temple

The Salt Lake Temple is the largest and best-known of the Church's operating temples. It is the sixth temple built by the church since its founding, and the fourth operating temple built following the Mormon exodus from Nauvoo, Illinois.

North and South Visitors' Centers

Beginning in 1963, two visitors' centers, called the North Visitors' Center and the South Visitors' Center, were constructed on temple square. The North Visitors' Center was built first and featured a replica of the Christus. The Christus was in a room called the Rotunda with large windows, and a domed ceiling painted with heavenly bodies meant to reflect the sky on April 6, 1830, the day that the Church was founded. The visitors' centers and grounds are staffed by full-time sister missionaries and senior missionary couples exclusively; no single male missionaries are called to serve on Temple Square. The sister missionaries serving on Temple Square are from around the world, speaking enough languages to cater to the majority of visitors. Beginning with the 2002 Winter Olympic Games in Salt Lake City, the sister missionaries have been wearing tags with the national flags of their home country along with their missionary name tags.

On April 19, 2019, church leaders announced that the South Visitors' Center will be demolished as part of a massive renovation project that will begin December 29, 2019. Two smaller visitors' pavilions will take its place. On June 10, 2021, it was announced that the North Visitors' Center would be demolished as well. It will be replaced by a garden designed as contemplative space.

Conference and assembly buildings

There are three large assembly buildings housed on Temple Square. The smallest of the three is the Salt Lake Assembly Hall, which seats approximately 2,000 and is on the southwest corner of Temple Square. The Assembly Hall is a Victorian Gothic congregation hall, with a cruciform layout of the interior that is complemented by Stars of David circumscribed high above each entrance, which symbolize the gathering of the Twelve Tribes of Israel. Construction of the hall began on August 11, 1877, and was completed in 1882. It is just south of the Salt Lake Tabernacle and across from the South Visitor Center near the South Gate. Upon entering Temple Square from the south, the Assembly Hall can be seen to the left (west). The Assembly Hall hosts occasional free weekend music concerts and is filled as overflow for the church's twice-a-year general conferences.

The second structure is the Salt Lake Tabernacle, home of the Mormon Tabernacle Choir and Orchestra at Temple Square. The Tabernacle was built between 1864 and 1867 with an overall seating capacity of 8,000, including the choir area and gallery. In March 2007, the Tabernacle was rededicated after extensive renovations and restorations were completed. Spacing between the pews was substantially increased, resulting in a reduced overall seating capacity. The Tabernacle was rededicated at the Saturday afternoon session of the church's 177th Annual General Conference. In addition to housing the choir, the Tabernacle is also used for other religious and cultural events.

The largest and most recently built assembly building is the LDS Conference Center. With a capacity of over 21,000, it is used primarily for the Church's general conferences as well as for concerts and other cultural events. The Conference Center was completed in 2000. Attached on the northwest corner of the Conference Center is the Conference Center Theater, an 850-seat theater for dramatic presentations, such as Savior of the World, as well as concerts and other events.

Museums and libraries

Family History Library

On the block west of Temple Square, the Family History Library is the largest genealogical library in the world and is open to the general public at no charge. The library holds genealogical records for over 110 countries, territories, and possessions. Its collections include over 2.4 million rolls of microfilmed genealogical records; 742,000 microfiche; 310,000 books, serials, and other formats; 4,500 periodicals; and 700 electronic resources.

Church History Museum

On the block west of Temple Square adjacent to the Family History Library, the Church History Museum houses collections of Latter-day Saint art and artifacts. The Museum houses permanent exhibits as well as playing host to temporary exhibits throughout the year. Past exhibits have included the 100th anniversary of the Boy Scouts of America, featuring 23 paintings by Norman Rockwell; displays and artwork from artist Arnold Friberg; and themed historical displays depicting church events.

Church History Library

On the block northeast of Temple Square and east of the Conference Center is the Church History Library, where the historical records of the Church are stored. The Library is free to patrons, who can come use a large collection of books, manuscripts, and photographs. Senior missionaries provide tours of the public areas of the Library. Patrons can also view a video explaining the mission and purpose of the Library.

See also

 List of National Historic Landmarks in Utah
 National Register of Historic Places listings in Salt Lake City
 Nauvoo Bell

References

Further reading
 
 
 KSL News: LDS Main Street Plaza Controversy

External links

 
 Official website – The Church of Jesus Christ of Latter-day Saints
 Official Site – Temple Square
 Panoramic View of Temple Square at Sunset
 

Temple Square
1853 establishments in Utah Territory
Historic districts on the National Register of Historic Places in Utah
National Historic Landmarks in Utah
Properties of religious function on the National Register of Historic Places in Utah
Significant places in Mormonism
Squares and plazas in Salt Lake City
Historic American Engineering Record in Utah
National Register of Historic Places in Salt Lake City